Daymar is a rural town and locality in the Goondiwindi Region, Queensland, Australia.

Geography 
The town is on the South Western railway line, with the town being served by the Daymar railway station.

The land use is a mix of crops and grazing on native vegetation.

History 
The town takes its name from the railway station, which in turn was named by Queensland Railways Department on 15 September 1911, and is thought to be an Aboriginal word, meaning red ridge.

Daymar Provisional School opened on 11 March 1946, becoming Daymar State School in 1952. In 1977-1978 the closed Kurumbul State School's building was relocated from Kurumbul to Daymar State School.

It closed on 9 December 1983. It was in Waugh Street opposite the railway station.

Amenities 
The Thallon-Daymar branch of the Queensland Country Women's Association has its rooms at 47 William Street in neighbouring Thallon in the Shire of Balonne,  to the west of Daymar.

Our Lady of Lourdes Catholic Church is in Waugh Street; services are held on the first Sunday of each month.

Education 
There are no schools in Daymar. The nearest primary school is Thallon State School in neighbouring Thallon to the west. The nearest secondary schools are Dirranbandi State School (to Year 10) in Dirranbandi to the west and St George State High School (to Year 12) in St George to the north-west. Given the distances to these secondary schools, distance education and boarding school would be other options.

References

External links 
 

Towns in Queensland
Goondiwindi Region
Localities in Queensland